William John Menzies (10 July 1901 – 1970) was a Scottish footballer who played in the Football League for Leeds United.

References

1901 births
1970 deaths
Scottish footballers
Association football defenders
English Football League players
Leeds United F.C. players
Goole Town F.C. players